Barnfather is an English surname. Notable people with the surname include:

 Percy Barnfather (1879–1951), English footballer
 James Barnfather, English cricketer
 George Barnfather, fictional policeman on Homicide: Life on the Street

English-language surnames